Sho' Nuff: The Complete Black Crowes is a five-disc box set from The Black Crowes. It contains their first four studio albums and a bonus live EP. The studio albums were remastered, contain bonus tracks and each include a screen saver and music videos presented in multimedia format. The Sho' Nuff edition of Amorica includes neither 'Tied Up and Swallowed' (bonus track on the original 1994 CD release) nor 'Chevrolet' (bonus on the Japanese release).

The EP consists of five tracks recorded live at the Beacon Theatre in New York City, between March 18–22, 1995. The box also includes two Black Crowes stickers.

All discs were printed on the American Recordings label (the first two had originally been released on Def American, the label's original name).

Album listing
1990: Shake Your Money Maker
Bonus tracks: "Don't Wake Me", "She Talks to Angels" (Acoustic)
Music videos: "Jealous Again", "She Talks to Angels"
1992: The Southern Harmony and Musical Companion
Bonus tracks: "Sting Me" (Slow version), "99 lbs."
Music videos: "Remedy", "Sometimes Salvation"
1994: Amorica
Bonus tracks: "Song of the Flesh", "Sunday Night Buttermilk Waltz"
Music videos: "Highhead Blues", "Wiser Time"
1996: Three Snakes & One Charm
Bonus tracks: "Just Say You're Sorry", "Mellow Down Easy"
Music video: "Blackberry"
1998: Live – see separate page for details

Personnel 

 Jeff Cease – guitar (Shake Your Money Maker only)
 Johnny Colt – bass
 Marc Ford – guitar (except Shake Your Money Maker)
 Steve Gorman – drums
 Eddie Harsch  – keyboards
 Chris Robinson – vocals
 Rich Robinson – guitar

Production

 The Black Crowes – production (except Shake Your Money Maker)
 George Drakoulias – production (Shake Your Money Maker & The Southern Harmony and Musical Companion only)
 Jack Joseph Puig – production (Amorica & Three Snakes & One Charm only)
 Leon Zervos – remastering

References

The Black Crowes compilation albums
1998 compilation albums
1998 video albums
Music video compilation albums